Qezel Tappeh-ye Ali Qoli (also Romanized as Qezel Tappeh-ye ‘Alī Qolī and Qezel Tappeh Alī Qolī; also known as Kyzyltappekh, Qezel Tappeh, and Qiziltepe) is a village in Zanjanrud-e Bala Rural District, in the Central District of Zanjan County, Zanjan Province, Iran. At the 2006 census, its population was 524, in 116 families.

References 

Populated places in Zanjan County